Lichtenstein is a municipality in the Tübingen administrative region in Baden-Württemberg, Germany. It lies at the foot of the Swabian Jura (plateau).

History
The municipality of Lichtenstein was created on 1 January 1975 by the merger of Honau, and Unterhausen (which had in 1930 merged with Oberhausen). By the agreement made before this merger, Unterhausen changed its name to Lichtenstein, after the famous Lichtenstein Castle above the town. The towns of the municipality expanded substantially from 1975 to 1990 thanks to tourism. Lichtenstein expanded the most, first purchasing an old industrial site in 1979 to turn it into a new town center.

Geography

Politics
Lichtenstein has been twinned with Voreppe, France, since 1992.

Coat of arms
The municipal coat of arms for Lichtenstein shows a white wing on a field of blue. This was the coat of arms of the extinct . The pattern was awarded to the municipality by the Federal Ministry of the Interior on 13 August 1975.

References

External links

Official website 

Reutlingen (district)